Rebecca Getzoff was an American who worked for the KGB during World War II.  Getzoff was engaged in anti-Trotskyist efforts in the United States on behalf of the Soviet Union.  Getzoff's cover name in Soviet intelligence and as deciphered in the Venona cables was "Adam".

Venona
Rebecca Getzoff is referenced in the following decrypted Venona cables:

826 KGB New York to Moscow, 7 June 1944; 
851 KGB New York to Moscow, 15 June 1944; 
907 KGB New York to Moscow, 26 June 1944; 
942 KGB New York to Moscow, 4 July 1944; 
292 KGB Moscow to New York, 29 March 1945.

References
 John Earl Haynes and Harvey Klehr, Venona: Decoding Soviet Espionage in America, Yale University Press (1999), pgs. 350, 451.

American spies for the Soviet Union
American people in the Venona papers
Possibly living people
Year of birth missing